Electoral district no. 7 is one of the 12 multi-member electoral districts of the Riigikogu, the national legislature of Estonia. Established in 1992 when the Riigikogu was re-established following Estonia's independence from the Soviet Union, the district was abolished in 1995 following the re-organisation of electoral districts only to be re-established in 2003. It is conterminous with the county of Ida-Viru. The district currently elects seven of the 101 members of the Riigikogu using the open party-list proportional representation electoral system. At the 2019 parliamentary election it had 56,836 registered electors.

Electoral system
Electoral district no. 7 currently elects seven of the 101 members of the Riigikogu using the open party-list proportional representation electoral system. The allocation of seats is carried out in three stages. In the first stage, any individual candidate, regardless of whether they are a party or independent candidate, who receives more votes than the district's simple quota (Hare quota: valid votes in district/number of seats allocated to district) is elected via a personal mandate. In the second stage, district mandates are allocated to parties by dividing their district votes by the district's simple quota. Only parties that reach the 5% national threshold compete for district mandates and any personal mandates won by the party are subtracted from the party's district mandates. Prior to 2003 if a party's surplus/remainder votes was equal to or greater than 75% of the district's simple quota it received one additional district mandate. Any unallocated district seats are added to a national pool of compensatory seats. In the final stage, compensatory mandates are calculated based on the national vote and using a modified D'Hondt method. Only parties that reach the 5% national threshold compete for compensatory seats and any personal and district mandates won by the party are subtracted from the party's compensatory mandates. Though calculated nationally, compensatory mandates are allocated at the district level.

Seats
Seats allocated to electoral district no. 7 by the National Electoral Committee of Estonia at each election was as follows:
 2023 - 6
 2019 - 7
 2015 - 7
 2011 - 8
 2007 - 8
 2003 - 8
 1992 - 5

Election results

Summary

(Excludes compensatory seats)

Detailed

2023
Results of the 2023 parliamentary election held on 5 March 2023:

The following candidates were elected:
 District mandates - Meelis Kiili (REF), 1,289 votes; and Yana Toom (KESK), 3,457 votes.
 Compensatory mandates - Arvo Aller (EKRE), 815 votes.

2019
Results of the 2019 parliamentary election held on 3 March 2019:

The following candidates were elected:
 Personal mandates - Yana Toom (K), 6,195 votes.
 District mandates - Eerik-Niiles Kross (RE), 1,110 votes; Katri Raik (SDE), 2,112 votes; Martin Repinski (K), 976 votes; and Mihhail Stalnuhhin (K), 2,653 votes.
 Compensatory mandates - Riho Breivel (EKRE), 979 votes.

2015
Results of the 2015 parliamentary election held on 1 March 2015:

The following candidates were elected:
 Personal mandates - Yana Toom (K), 11,574 votes.
 District mandates - Deniss Boroditš (RE), 769 votes; Valeri Korb (K), 1,046 votes; Jevgeni Ossinovski (SDE), 2,784 votes; Martin Repinski (K), 1,556 votes; and Mihhail Stalnuhhin (K), 3,648 votes.

2011
Results of the 2011 parliamentary election held on 6 March 2011:

The following candidates were elected:
 Personal mandates - Mihhail Stalnuhhin (K), 8,584 votes.
 District mandates - Eldar Efendijev (K), 1,650 votes; Lembit Kaljuvee (K), 2,440 votes; Valeri Korb (K), 3,596 votes; Erki Nool (IRL), 1,397 votes; Kristiina Ojuland (RE), 2,127 votes; Jevgeni Ossinovski (SDE), 1,578 votes.
 Compensatory mandates - Jaak Allik (SDE), 1,518 votes.

2007
Results of the 2007 parliamentary election held on 4 March 2007:

The following candidates were elected:
 Personal mandates - Mihhail Stalnuhhin (K), 5,474 votes.
 District mandates - Eldar Efendijev (K), 3,751 votes; Valeri Korb (K), 4,039 votes; Tiit Kuusmik (K), 1,631 votes; and Jaanus Rahumägi (RE), 2,144 votes.
 Compensatory mandates - Rein Aidma (RE), 1,303 votes.

2003
Results of the 2003 parliamentary election held on 2 March 2003:

The following candidates were elected:
 Personal mandates - Mihhail Stalnuhhin (K), 4,626 votes.
 District mandates - Rein Aidma (RE), 1,573 votes; Mati Jostov (K), 2,627 votes; Ants Pauls (ÜVE-RP), 1,797 votes; and Kaarel Pürg (K), 1,440 votes.
 Compensatory mandates - Nelli Kalikova (ÜVE-RP), 755 votes; and Kristiina Ojuland (RE), 1,208 votes.

1992
Results of the 1992 parliamentary election held on 20 September 1992:

The following candidates were elected:
 District mandates - Olli Toomik (R), 1,883 votes.
 Compensatory mandates - Avo Kiir (ERSP), 624 votes.

References

Riigikogu electoral district
07
07
07
07